The EGF-like domain is an evolutionary conserved protein domain, which derives its name from the epidermal growth factor where it was first described. It comprises about 30 to 40 amino-acid residues and has been found in a large number of mostly animal proteins. Most occurrences of the EGF-like domain are found in the extracellular domain of membrane-bound proteins or in proteins known to be secreted. An exception to this is the prostaglandin-endoperoxide synthase. The EGF-like domain includes 6 cysteine residues which in the epidermal growth factor have been shown to form 3 disulfide bonds. The structures of 4-disulfide EGF-domains have been solved from the laminin and integrin proteins. The main structure of EGF-like domains is a two-stranded β-sheet followed by a loop to a short C-terminal, two-stranded β-sheet. These two β-sheets are usually denoted as the major (N-terminal) and minor (C-terminal) sheets. EGF-like domains frequently occur in numerous tandem copies in proteins: these repeats typically fold together to form a single, linear solenoid domain block as a functional unit.

Subtypes
Despite the similarities of EGF-like domains, distinct domain subtypes have been identified. The two main proposed types of EGF-like domains are the human EGF-like (hEGF) domain and the complement C1r-like (cEGF) domain, which was first identified in the human complement protease C1r. C1r is a highly specific serine protease initiating the classical pathway of complement activation during immune response. Both the hEGF- and cEGF-like domains contain three disulfides and derive from a common ancestor that carried four disulfides of which one was lost during evolution. Furthermore, cEGF-like domains can be divided in two subtypes (1 and 2) whereas all hEGF-like domains belong to one subtype.

The differentiation of cEGF-like and hEGF-like domains and their subtypes is based on structural features and the connectivity of their disulfide bonds. cEGF- and hEGF-like domains have a distinct shape and orientation of the minor sheet and one C-terminal half-cystine has a different position. The lost cysteines of the common ancestor differ between cEGF- and hEGF-like domains and hence these types differ in their disulfide linkages. The differentiation of cEGF into subtype 1 and 2, which probably occurred after its split from hEGF, is based on different residue numbers between the distinct half-cystines. An N-terminal located calcium binding motif can be found in hEGF- as well as in cEGF-like domains and is therefore not suitable to tell them apart.

hEGF- and cEGF-like domains also contain post-translational modifications, which are often unusual and differ between hEGF- and cEGF-like domains. These post-translational modifications include O-glycosylations, mostly O-fucose modifications, and β-hydroxylation of aspartate and asparagine residues. O-fucose modifications have only been detected in hEGF-like domains and they are important for the proper folding of the hEGF-like domain. β-Hydroxylation appears in hEGF- and cEGF-like domains, the former is hydroxylated on an aspartic acid while the latter is hydroxylated on an asparagine residue. The biological role of this post-translational modification is unclear, but mice with a knockout of the aspartyl-β-hydroxylation enzyme show developmental defects.

Proteins containing EGF-like domains are widespread and can be exclusively hEGF- or cEGF-like, or contain a mix of both. In many mitogenic and developmental proteins such as Notch and Delta the EGF-like domains are only of the hEGF type. Other proteins contain only cEGF such as thrombomodulin and the LDL-receptor. In mixed EGF-proteins the hEGF- and cEGF-like domains are grouped together with the hEGFs always being N-terminal of the cEGFs. Such proteins are involved in blood coagulation or are components of the extracellular matrix like fibrillin and LTBP-1 (Latent-transforming growth factor beta-binding protein 1). In addition to the aforementioned three disulfide hEGF- and cEGF-like types, there are proteins carrying a four-disulfide EGF-like domain like laminin and integrin.

The two main EGF-like domain subtypes hEGF and cEGF are not just distinct in their structure and conformation but also have different functions. This hypothesis is substantiated by research on LTBP-1. LTBP-1 anchors the transforming growth factor β (TGF-β) to the extracellular matrix. hEGF-like domains play a role in targeting the LTBP-1/TGF-β assembly to the extracellular matrix. Once attached to the extracellular matrix, TGF-β dissociates from hEGF subunits to allow its subsequent activation. cEGF-like domains seem to play an unspecific role in this activation by promoting the cleavage of LTBP-1 from TGF-β by various proteases.

In conclusion, although distinct EGF-like domains are grouped, subtypes can be clearly separated by their sequence, conformation and, most importantly, their function.

Role in the immune system and apoptosis
Selectins, a group of proteins that are involved in leukocyte rolling towards a source of inflammation, contain an EGF-like domain along with a lectin domain and short consensus repeats (SCRs). The functions of the EGF-like domain vary between different selectin types. Kansas and co-workers were able to show that the EGF-like domain is not required for maximal cellular adhesion in L-selectin (expressed on lymphocytes). However, it is involved in both ligand recognition and adhesion in P-selectin (expressed on platelets) and may also be involved in protein-protein interactions. It has been suggested that the interactions between lectin domains and carbohydrate ligands might be calcium-dependent.

Immature human dendritic cells appear to require interactions with the EGF-like domains of selectins during their maturation process. Blocking of this interaction with monoclonal anti-EGF-like domain antibodies prevents dendritic cell maturation. The immature cells fail to activate T-cells and produce less interleukin 12 than wild-type dendritic cells.

Phan et al. could show that the artificial insertion of an N-glycosylation site into the EGF-like domains in P- and L-selectins increased the affinities of selectins to their ligands and led to slower rolling. Therefore, EGF-like domains seem to play a crucial role in leukocyte movements towards inflammatory stimuli.

The EGF-like domain is also part of laminins, an important group of extracellular proteins. The EGF-like domains are usually masked in intact membranes, but become exposed when the membrane is destroyed, e.g. during inflammation, thereby stimulating membrane growth and restoring damaged membrane parts.

Moreover, the EGF-like domain repeats of the stabilin-2 domain have been shown to specifically recognize and bind apoptotic cells, probably by recognizing phosphatidylserine, an apoptotic cell marker (“eat me-signal”). Park et al. further demonstrated that the domains are able to competitively impair recognition of apoptotic cells by macrophages.

In conclusion, the EGF-like domain appears to play a vital role in immune responses as well as in eliminating dead cells in the organism.

Calcium-binding
Calcium-binding EGF-like domains (cbEGF-like domains) play a seminal role in diseases such as the Marfan syndrome or the X-chromosome linked hemorrhagic disorder hemophilia B and are among the most abundant extracellular calcium-binding domains. Importantly, cbEGF- like domains impart specific functions to a variety of proteins in the blood clotting cascade. Examples include the coagulation factors VII, IX and X, protein C and its cofactor protein S.

Calcium-binding EGF-like domains are typically composed of 45 amino acids, arranged as two antiparallel beta sheets. Several cysteine residues within this sequence form disulfide bridges.

cbEGF-like domains show no significant structural deviations from EGF-like domains; however, as the name suggests, cbEGF-like domains bind a single calcium ion. The binding affinity to calcium varies widely and often depends on adjacent domains. The consensus motif for calcium binding is Asp-Leu/Ile-Asp-Gln-Cys. Coordination of calcium strongly correlates with an unusual posttranslational modification of cbEGF-like domains: either an asparagine or aspartate is beta-hydroxylated giving rise to erythro-beta-hydroxyasparagine (Hyn) or erythro-beta-hydroxyaspartic acid (Hya), respectively. Hya can be found in the N-terminal cbEGF module (see below) of factors IX, X, and protein C. The Hyn modification appears to be more prevalent than Hya and has been shown to occur in fibrillin-1, an extracellular matrix protein. Both modifications are catalyzed by the dioxygenase Asp/Asn-beta-hydroxylase, and are unique to EGF domains in eukaryotes.

Further posttranslational modifications have been reported. Glycosylation in the form of O-linked di- or trisaccharides may occur at a serine residue between the first two cysteines of blood coagulation factors VII and IX. Factor VII exhibits an O-linked fucose at Ser60.

Multiple cbEGF domains are often connected by one or two amino acids to form larger, repetitive arrays, here referred to as 'cbEGF modules'. In the blood-clotting cascade, coagulation factors VII, IX and X and protein C contain a tandem of two cbEGF modules, whereas protein S has four. Impressively, in fibrillin-1 and fibrillin-2, 43 cbEGF modules have been found. The modularity of these proteins adds complexity to protein-protein but also module-module interaction. In factors VII, IX and X, the two cbEGF modules are preceded by an N-terminal gamma-carboxyglutamic acid (Gla) containing module (the Gla module). In vitro studies on the Gla-cbEGF tandem isolated from factor X revealed a Kd-value of 0.1 mM for calcium binding  with the free calcium blood plasma concentrations being approximately 1.2 mM. Surprisingly, in the absence of the Gla module, the cbEGF module exhibits a Kd-value of 2.2 mM for calcium. Thus, the presence of the Gla module increases calcium affinity 20-fold. Similarly, the activity of Gla and serine protease modules are modified by the cbEGF modules. In the absence of calcium, the Gla and cbEGF modules are highly mobile. As the cbEGF module associates with calcium, however, movement of the Gla module is significantly restricted because the cbEGF module now adopts a conformation that locks the neighboring Gla module in a fixed position. Therefore, calcium coordination induces conformational changes which, in turn, might modulate enzymatic activity.

Impaired coordination of calcium can result in serious disorders. Defective calcium binding to coagulation factor IX contributes to the development of hemophilia B. Individuals with this hereditary disease tend to develop hemorrhages, potentially leading to life-threatening conditions. The cause of hemophilia B is decreased activity or deficiency of blood coagulation factor IX. Point mutations resulting in decreased affinity of factor IX to calcium are thought to be implicated in this bleeding disorder. On a molecular basis, it appears that hemophilia B can be the result of an impaired ability to localize the Gla module efficiently, as it usually occurs after calcium coordination by the cbEGF module in fully functional factor IX. This defect is thought to impair the biological function of factor IX. A similar problem occurs in patients with hemophilia B and carrying a mutation (Glu78Lys) in factor IX that prevents interaction of the two cbEGF modules with one another. Conversely, in healthy individuals, Glu78 in the first cbEGF-module contacts Arg94 in the second cbEGF module and thereby aligns both modules. Thus, domain-domain interactions (partially facilitated by calcium coordination) are crucial for the catalytic activity of proteins involved in the blood-clotting cascade.

Proteins containing this domain 
Below is a list of human proteins containing the EGF-like domain:
 AGC1; AGRIN; AREG; ATRN; ATRNL1; 
 BCAN; BMP1; BTC;
 C1S; CASPR4; CD248; CD93; CELSR1; CELSR2; CELSR3; CLEC14A; CNTNAP1; CNTNAP2; CNTNAP3; CNTNAP4; CNTNAP5; COMP; COX-2; CRB1; CRB2; CSPG3; CUBN; 
 DLK1; DLL1; DLL3; DLL4; DNER; 
 EDIL3; EGF; EGFL11; EGFL8; EGFL9; EGFLAM; EPGN; EREG; 
 F7; F9; F10; F12; FAT; FAT2; FAT4; FBN1; FBN2; FBN3; 
 GAS6; 
 HABP2; HBEGF; HEG1; HGFAC; HMCN1; HSPG2;
 ITGB5; 
 JAG1; JAG2; 
 LDLR; LRP1; LRP10; LRP1B; LRP2; LRP4; LRP5; LRP6; LRP8; LTBP1; LTBP2; LTBP3; LTBP4;
 MATN1; MATN2; MATN3; MATN4; MEGF12; MEGF6; MEP1A; MEP1B; MFGE8; MMRN1; MMRN1; MUC4; 
 NAGPA; NID1; NID2; NOTCH1; NOTCH2; NOTCH2NL; NOTCH3; NOTCH4; NRG1; NRG2; NRG3; NRG4; NRXN1; NRXN2; NRXN3; NTNG2; 
 ODZ1; ODZ2; OIT3;
 PLAT; PP187; PROC; PROS1; PROZ; PTGS1; PTGS2; 
 RAMP; 
 SCUBE1; SCUBE2; SCUBE3; SEL-OB; SELE; SELL; SELP; SLIT1; SLIT2; SLIT3; SNED1; STAB1; STAB2; SVEP1; 
 TECTA; TGFA; THBD; THBS1; THBS2; THBS4; TIE1; TLL1; TLL2; TMEFF1; TMEFF2; TNC; TNXB; 
 UMOD; 
 VASN; VCAN; VLDLR; VWA2; 
 WIF1; 
 ZAN;

See also 
Epidermal growth factor

References 

Protein domains
Single-pass transmembrane proteins